Perbundos (Perboundos) was a 7th-century king of the Rhynchinoi, a Slavic group in Macedonia. In ca. 675 he was taken prisoner by the Byzantine Empire due to his hostile intentions towards Thessalonica, and transported to Constantinople. Perbundos managed to escape, but was recaptured and executed, whereupon the Slavic tribes of Macedonia rose up and laid siege to Thessalonica.

Life 
Perbundos is attested only in the Miracles of Saint Demetrius, a 7th-century collection of homilies in praise of Saint Demetrius, the patron saint of Thessalonica, which provides much unique historical information about the collapse of Byzantine imperial authority and the Slavic settlement in the Balkans.

In the second book of the Miracles, Perbundos is called the "king of the Rhynchinoi", an apparently relatively powerful Slavic tribe living near Thessalonica. According to the Miracles, in ca. 675/6 he came to the attention of the Byzantine archon of Thessalonica as being hostile and planning an attack on the city. When informed, Emperor Constantine IV ordered his arrest, and during a visit to the city, Perbundos was seized, put in irons and sent to the Byzantine capital, Constantinople. The Rhynchinoi, along with the other Slavic tribes living in the Strymon valley (Strymonitai), sent envoys to the emperor seeking his release, and Constantine promised to let him go once the war with the Arabs was over.

In the meantime, however, Perbundos found an ally in the person of an imperial translator, who urged him to escape. By passing himself off as a Byzantine (he spoke fluent Greek and was dressed in the Byzantine manner) Perbundos simply walked out of the city through the Blachernae Gate, and found refuge on the translator's estate near Bizye. Enraged, the Emperor launched a manhunt for the escaped prisoner, and notified Thessalonica that the city might soon be attacked. The search ended after forty days, when the translator's wife was discovered as she was bringing food to Perbundos' hideout. The translator and his family were executed, while Perbundos was interrogated. After trying once more to escape again, and as his intention of raising all the Slavic tribes in revolt against the empire became evident, he too was executed.

On the news of Perbundos' execution, the Rhynchinoi, the Strymonitai and the Sagoudatai made common cause, rose up and laid siege to Thessalonica for two years.

References

Sources 
 
 

7th-century Slavs
7th-century rulers in Europe
7th-century executions by the Byzantine Empire
Rulers in medieval Macedonia
670s deaths
Year of birth unknown
South Slavic history